At the Point is a live album by the rock artist Matt Nathanson. It was released in 2006 on Acrobat Records. The album is titled after The Point, the venue where Nathanson recorded the album over the course of four sold-out shows during the summer of 2005.

Track listing
"Decades of Hits (Dialogue)"  – 1:02 
"Angel"  – 1:34 
"I Saw" – 3:29 
"Church Clothes"  – 3:48 
"Curve of the Earth"  – 3:23 
"Princess"  – 3:48 
"A Line from Lie (Dialogue)"  – 2:43 
"Bent"  – 4:04 
"All Been Said Before"  – 4:30 
"Lost Myself in Search of You"  – 3:44 
"Romeo and Juliet"  – 4:25 
"St. Louis Pants (Dialogue)"  – 2:27 
"Fall to Pieces"  – 3:52 
"More than This"  – 3:57 
"Philadelphia Song (Dialogue)"  – 2:34 
"Answering Machine"  – 5:20 
"Suspended"  – 3:45 
"Sing Me Sweet (Bonus Track)"  – 4:22 
"Straight to Hell (Bonus Track)"  – 4:11

References
 Matt Nathanson official site

Matt Nathanson albums
2006 live albums